4K, 4-K or 4k may refer to:
 4000 (number)
 Four kibibytes (4 × 1024 bytes, better written 4 KiB)
 4K disk sector size (Advanced Format)
 4K demoscene compo, a computer art competition using programs limited to 4 kibibytes
 The Java 4K Game Programming Contest
 4K resolution, a collective term for digital video formats having a horizontal resolution of approximately 4,000 pixels
 4K UHDTV, an ultra-high-definition television format
 4K, the IATA airline code for Askari Aviation
 4K, an alternative name for Cuatro Cabezas (Four Heads), an Argentine multimedia production company.
 4K, model of Toyota K engine
 4K, the production code for the 1976 Doctor Who serial The Brain of Morbius

See also
 K4 (disambiguation)